T11 may refer to:

Anatomy 
 Eleventh thoracic vertebra
 Thoracic spinal nerve 11

Aviation 
 Marathon T.11, a British trainer aircraft
 T-11 Kansan, an American trainer aircraft
 T-11 parachute, used by the United States Army
 Yap International Airport, in the Federated States of Micronesia

Rail and transit

Lines 
 Île-de-France tramway Line 11 Express, France
 T11 line, of the Stockholm Metro

Locomotives 
 Prussian T 11, a steam locomotive

Stations 
 Arahata Station, Nagoya, Aichi Prefecture, Japan
 Dainichi Station, Osaka, Japan
 Kayabachō Station, Tokyo, Japan
 Kikusui Station, Sapporo, Hokkaido, Japan
 Sanjō Keihan Station, Kyoto, Japan
 Sanuki-Shirotori Station, Higashikagawa, Kagawa Prefecture, Japan

Other uses 
 T11 (classification), a disability sport classification
 T11 (satellite)
 Autovía T-11, a highway in Catalonia, Spain
 DEC T-11, a microprocessor
 Estonian national road 11
 
 Gilbern T11, a concept car
 Robbins Island language
 Simca-Gordini T11, a racing car
 Soyuz T-11, a 1984 space mission
 T11 torpedo
 T11, on the TORRO scale of tornado intensity